Robert Paul Ramsey (December 10, 1913 – February 29, 1988) was an American Christian ethicist of the 20th century. He was a Methodist and a native of Mississippi. He graduated from Millsaps College in Mississippi and Yale University. The major portion of his academic career was spent as a tenured professor at Princeton University until the end of his life in 1988.

Life
Paul Ramsey undertook his doctoral studies at Yale where he was mentored by H. Richard Niebuhr. He subsequently taught Christian Ethics at Princeton. Ramsay has been credited with laying the intellectual foundations of bioethics and informed consent through his book The Patient as Person, which has continued to be a standard text in medical ethics across multiple editions. He has been credited with re-introducing just war theory into Protestant ethical reflection. His popular text book Basic Christian Ethics was reviewed by a young John Rawls.

Bibliography
 Basic Christian Ethics (1950) 
 War and the Christian Conscience: How Shall Modern War Be Conducted Justly? Durham, North Carolina 1961
 Nine Modern Moralists, Prentice Hall, 1962
 Deeds and Rules in Christian Ethics, University of America Press 1967.
 The Case of the Curious Exception in Gene Outka and Paul Ramsey eds. Norm and context in Christian Ethics, New York 1968.
 The Just War: Force and Political Responsibility, New York 1968
 Fabricated Man
 The Ethics of Fetal Research, New Haven: Yale University Press, 1975.
 Doing evil to achieve good : moral choice in conflict situations, Loyola University Press, Chicago, 1978,  (with Richard A. McCormick, S.J.)
 The Patient as Person. Explorations in medical ethics, March 1970, New Haven, Connecticut
 The Essential Paul Ramsey 
 Ethics at the Edges of Life, New Haven: Yale U.P., 1980.
 Speak Up for Just War or Pacifism. A Critique of the United Methodist Bishops' Pastoral Letter "In Defense of Creation" Pennsylvania State University Press, 1988

Secondary literature
 Paul Ramsey's Ethics: The Power of 'Agape' in a Postmodern World (2000) 
 Carnahan, Kevin. Reinhold Niebuhr and Paul Ramsey: Idealist and Pragmatic Christians on Politics, Philosophy, Religion, and War  (2010)

References

External links
 The Birth of Bioethics: Who is Paul Ramsey? (Albert R. Jonsen, 2001 from the preface to the second edition of Paul Ramsey's ground breaking book The Patient as Person) Thecbc.org
 NYTimes Obituary of Paul Ramsey

1913 births
1988 deaths
Christian ethicists
Methodist theologians
People from Mendenhall, Mississippi
Millsaps College alumni
Yale University alumni
Princeton University faculty
Burials at Princeton Cemetery
American Freemasons
Members of the National Academy of Medicine